The Francis A. and Rose M. Turner House is a historic building located in Avoca, Iowa, United States.  Turner was born in Des Moines County, Iowa, and the family moved to Pottawattamie County the following year where they farmed.  After spending a period of time teaching, he studied law and settled in Avoca after passing the bar.  Rose M. Woodward was a local school teacher.  Their grandson Richard, also an attorney, entered politics and became Iowa's Attorney General and the U.S. Attorney for the Southern District of Iowa.  This two-story frame Neoclassical house was built in 1905, probably by local builder Fred Thiessen.  After Francis' death in 1935 the house passed to their son Joe and his wife Elizabeth.  It was listed on the National Register of Historic Places in 1997.

References

Houses completed in 1905
Houses in Pottawattamie County, Iowa
National Register of Historic Places in Pottawattamie County, Iowa
Houses on the National Register of Historic Places in Iowa
Neoclassical architecture in Iowa
1905 establishments in Iowa